You Can't Trust a Ladder is the first studio album from indie rock band The Myriad. It was released on June 14, 2005 through Floodgate Records.

Track listing
"Stretched Over" - 3:22
"When Fire Falls" - 4:25
"10,000 X 10,000" - 4:08
"The Last Time" - 3:15
"Perfect Obligation" - 3:35
"Tethered" - 2:52
"Godray" - 3:23
[Untitled Track] - 0:22
"A New Language" - 3:06
"Nothing Is Safe" - 3:13
"We Will Be Disappointed Together" - 6:00

Awards

In 2006, the album was nominated for a Dove Award for Recorded Music Packaging of the Year at the 37th GMA Dove Awards.

References

2005 albums
Albums produced by Aaron Marsh